Family Time is an American television sitcom that was created by Bentley Kyle Evans, and aired on Bounce TV from June 18, 2012, to December 16, 2020. It stars Omar Gooding and Angell Conwell as Anthony and Lisa Stallworth, a working-class family bumped to the middle class by a winning lottery ticket. It was the first original series for the network.

The first season has six episodes and aired on summer of 2012. The 10-episode second season aired from October 14, 2014, to December 14, 2014. On May 7, 2015, the series was renewed for a third season that aired from October 6, 2015, to December 8, 2015. On April 13, 2016, the show was renewed for a fourth season,  airing from October 4, 2016, to December 27, 2016. On August 3, 2017, the show was renewed for a fifth season, that premiered on October 3, 2017. The series was renewed for a sixth season and premiered on October 1, 2018. The series has also been renewed for a 13 episode-seventh season, that premiered on October 9, 2019. On August 11th, the series was renewed for an eighth season, airing from October 7, 2020, to December 16, 2020.

Premise
After a construction worker gets lucky, winning $500,000 on a lottery scratch-off ticket, he suddenly find himself and his wife launched into middle-class society, and decide to move with their two young children into a new neighborhood.

Cast and characters

Regular cast
 Omar Gooding as Anthony "Tony" Stallworth
 Angell Conwell as Lisa Calloway-Stallworth
 Jayla Calhoun as Ebony Stallworth: Lisa and Tony's daughter
 Bentley Kyle Evans Jr. as Devin Stallworth: Lisa and Tony's son

Recurring cast
 Tanjareen Thomas as Rachel Calloway, Lisa's sassy younger sister; a lesbian
 Paula Jai Parker as Lori Calloway-Wilson, Lisa's older sister 
 Clayton Thomas as Donnie
 Rodney Perry as Rodney 
 Chris Williams and Erica Shaffer as Todd (Season 1-2 for Todd) and Vivian Stallworth, Tony's well-to-do brother and Caucasian sister-in-law
 Richard Gant and Judyann Elder as Darius and Beverly Stallworth, Tony's parents
 Shanti Lowry as Cheryl 
 KJ Smith  as Melinda (season 3–6)
 Teresa Topnotch as Brandy (season 7–8)

Guest stars also include Lynn Whitfield, Lawrence Hilton-Jacobs, Jackée Harry, Dorian Gregory and Michelle Williams.

Episodes

Series overview

Season 1 (2012)

Season 2 (2014)

Season 3 (2015)

Season 4 (2016)

Season 5 (2017)

Season 6 (2018)

Season 7 (2019)

Season 8 (2020)

References

External links
 
 

2010s American black sitcoms
2012 American television series debuts
English-language television shows
Television shows set in California
Bounce TV original programming
Television series about families